Fish Creek Falls is a waterfall located about 5 miles to the east of Steamboat Springs, Colorado, in Routt National Forest. Fish Creek runs from several small lakes in the Rabbit Ears Range of Colorado.

In the summertime, the road to Fish Creek Falls often becomes clogged in mid-afternoon with tourists wanting to see the  waterfall. It is possible to hike all the way to the terminus of the waterfall through giant boulders and rushing water. There are two hiking trails from the parking lot at the end of Fish Creek Fall Road. One is 1/4 of a mile and goes through several Aspen groves with the occasional Subalpine Fir. It ends at a viewing station where the entirety of the falls can be seen. The other trail goes straight down into the U-shaped valley formed by glaciers. As it nears the bottom of the valley, one can hear the rushing sound of water over the fall and see beautiful Fish Creek. The trail continues on to Upper Fish Creek Falls and then on to the Wyoming Trail, a long trail running the northwestern mountains of Colorado to Wyoming. The falls provide a great place for ice climbing in the winter when 300+ inches of snow fall on the mountains east of Steamboat Springs.

Image gallery

See also
Waterfalls of Colorado

References

External links
Photo of the waterfall by pdsphil from Flickr

Waterfalls of Colorado
Protected areas of Routt County, Colorado
Plunge waterfalls
Landforms of Routt County, Colorado